Quilotoa is a water-filled crater lake and the most western volcano in the Ecuadorian Andes.  The -wide caldera was formed by the collapse of this dacite volcano following a catastrophic VEI-6 eruption about 800 years ago, which produced pyroclastic flows and lahars that reached the Pacific Ocean, and spread an airborne deposit of volcanic ash throughout the northern Andes.  This last eruption followed a dormancy period of 14,000 years and is known as the 1280 Plinian eruption. The fourth (of seven) eruptive phase was phreatomagmatic, indicating that a Crater lake was already present at that time. The caldera has since accumulated a  crater lake, which has a greenish color as a result of dissolved minerals.  Fumaroles are found on the lake floor and hot springs occur on the eastern flank of the volcano.

Quilotoa is a cat  site of growing popularity.  The route to the "summit" (the small town of Quilotoa) is generally traveled by hired truck or bus from the town of Zumbahua  to the South, or more commonly by bus from Latacunga.  Visitors have to pay two US  dollars each to enter Quilotoa.  There are a number of simple hostels in the immediate area offering services such as mules and guides. Activities include a four to five-hour hike around the caldera (whose diameter is just over ). The caldera rim is highly irregular and reaches its maximum elevations ( to the N, ( to the NW and ( to the SE) at three lava domes. The ( hike is sandy and steep in places and can be quite taxing, particularly if there is fog.

It is a half-hour hike down from the viewpoint (and 1- to 2-hour hike back up the ( vertical ascent), and very basic lodging down in its bowl. Camping is permitted at the bottom of the crater, but there is no potable water (except half-litre bottles sold at the hostel)

The lake surface is located at ( asl. The total volume of water stored in Lake Quilotoa is (. According to local inhabitants, the lake level has been slowly declining over the last 10 years. Travertine deposits occur along the shore up to ( above the lake level (in the year 2000).

The village of Quilotoa and the associated crater is also a popular destination within the Quilotoa Loop and is a common starting point for the Quilotoa Traverse, a multi-day village to village hiking route.

See also

 Volcanic crater lake

References

External links 

 Travel information
 Jan 2009 Updated travel info
 Events in Quilotoa

Volcanoes of Ecuador
Calderas of Ecuador
Geography of Cotopaxi Province
Andean Volcanic Belt
Active volcanoes
Volcanic crater lakes
Subduction volcanoes
VEI-6 volcanoes
Holocene calderas